The Pasig River Ferry Service (PRFS) is a public water bus service based in Metro Manila, the Philippines. It is currently the only water-based transportation service in Metro Manila that cruises the length of the Pasig River and Marikina River, passing through the cities of Manila, Makati, Mandaluyong, Pasig, Marikina, and Taguig.

Originally owned and operated by a private company, SCC Nautical Transport Services Incorporated, the service was suspended in February 2011, but was reopened on April 28, 2014, and is currently owned and operated by the Metro Manila Development Authority. Although the service is commonly referred to as a ferry, it is more akin to a water bus given its multiple stops.

History
Prior to the 1990s, there were several short-lived ferry operators that provided passenger services along the Pasig River. According to the Metro Manila Urban Transportation Integration Study (MMUTIS) conducted by the Japan International Cooperation Agency (JICA) in March 1999, there was a ferry service that used to operate between the districts of Santa Cruz and Santa Ana in Manila from 1969, which had eventually ceased operations. It is said that pollution in the Pasig River contributed to the decline in ferry transport in the river in the 1960s.

In the 1980s, the Philippine government began showing interest in a ferry service along and across the Pasig River when the Ministry of Transport and Communications (now the Department of Transportation) conducted feasibility studies for ferry passenger traffic in 1980, with another feasibility study being conducted in 1989.

Metro Ferry
In 1990, Filipino shipping conglomerate Magsaysay Lines began operating Metro Ferry as an alternative mode of transport along the Pasig River to alleviate the traffic problem in Manila. The Metro Ferry operated a route from Guadalupe in then-municipality of Makati down to Escolta Street in Manila, spanning a total length of  using river-side sheds as stations and piers constructed by the Philippine Ports Authority. The service, however, lasted only for a year, closing in 1991. Its short-lived operation was beset by problems such as the proliferation of informal settlers along the route, water lilies, garbage and other debris clogging the waters. Aside from the foul odors permeating the environs, these problems also prevented the boats from traveling at normal speeds.

StarCraft Ferry
In 1995, the StarCraft Ferry Corporation submitted proposals to provide passenger services on the river. A year earlier, however, Uniwide Sales-owned Marilag Transport Systems also submitted a proposal for ferry services not only along the Pasig River but also to and from the province of Cavite and the Baclaran area in Parañaque using foreign-made boats. The company hoped to use its Pasig River ferry services to provide transport services between its shopping centers but eventually dropped its proposal after the Philippine government prohibited the use of foreign-made boats, rendering the project unattractive.

In response to concerns about competing ferry operations along the river, President Fidel V. Ramos formed an inter-agency committee composed of national government agencies and local government units to prepare guidelines for ferryboat service on the Pasig River and plan future interconnections with ferry services in Laguna de Bay.

Eventually, StarCraft Ferry was awarded the project, with operations beginning in October 1997. The company operated a  route spanning the seven stations of Escolta, Lawton, PUP, and Punta in Manila, Hulo in Mandaluyong, Guadalupe in Makati, and Bambang in Pasig.

The company had a fleet of 30 locally-constructed Manta boats (the same type used by the current Pasig River Ferry Service). Each boat carries a seating capacity of 32 passengers. By 1999, however, only 19 such boats were still in operations as many of StarCraft boats were damaged by chipped debris or had clogged propellers.

Ridership of the StarCraft Ferry at the time was recorded at 900 to 1,200 passengers per day, with the most common trips being recorded between its Guadalupe station in Makati and the Escolta or Lawton stations in Manila. Additionally, StarCraft Ferry also operated a ferry service between Escolta in Manila and Los Baños, Laguna from 1998 onwards until its license was revoked by the Laguna Lake Development Authority due to insufficient paperwork.  StarCraft's ferry services in the Pasig River lasted for almost three years until it closed in 1999, facing the same problems with foul odor and debris along the river that hampered its operating speeds.

Current iteration

Initial reopening

The current ferry service, the Pasig River Ferry Service, was inaugurated by President Gloria Macapagal Arroyo on February 14, 2007 that initially covered 15 stations, namely Escolta, Plaza Mexico, Quezon Bridge, PUP, Lambingan, and Santa Ana in Manila, Valenzuela and Guadalupe in Makati, Hulo in Mandaluyong, San Joaquin and Caniogan in Pasig, Riverbanks, Santa Elena, and Marcos Bridge in Marikina, and Napindan in Taguig. The service launched with an initial fleet of three catamaran boats operated by a private operator.

Unlike the previous Pasig River ferry services, the Pasig River Ferry Service planned to use air-conditioned boats with faster travel speeds and onboard amenities such as payphones, a security system, and a ticketing system with single journey and storage value RFID ticketing.

The Pasig River Ferry Service, however, operated at a loss, with the Pasig River Ferry Service ceasing operations in 2011. A Commission on Audit report in 2011 revealing that the operating expenses of the service amounted to  million against a revenue of  million. This resulted in the service being highly dependent on government subsidies. In response to the report, the Pasig River Rehabilitation Commission stated that ferry revenue declined due to a dwindling number of passengers and frequent cancellation of regular trips in order to accommodate river tours.

Current service
In 2014, the Metropolitan Manila Development Authority (MMDA) proposed a revival of the Pasig River Ferry Service to alleviate the traffic situation in Metro Manila in light of several infrastructure projects being constructed simultaneously. Ferry services were officially relaunched with four privately-owned ferries and a MMDA vessel on April 28, 2014, with the service being operated by the MMDA in conjunction with the Department of Transportation and Communications and the Pasig River Rehabilitation Commission.

Rehabilitation and current developments
In 2018, the Department of Budget and Management (DBM) pitched the Pasig River Ferry Convergence Program, a plan to develop an additional 17 stations in the next four years to serve up to 76,800 passengers daily and to bid out a contract to operate the Pasig River Ferry Service to a private firm. The MMDA had also committed to build three more stations at Circuit Makati and Quinta Market, and Kalawaan in Pasig. The DBM also bared plans to put up stations near bridges across the river, use air-conditioned vessels with a seating capacity of 50 passengers each, to operate under all weather conditions, and a planned headway of 15 minutes.

The rehabilitated Pasig River Ferry Service was relaunched on December 9, 2019. Both Pasig mayor Vico Sotto and Manila mayor Isko Moreno have both committed to donate at least two boats to the ferry service. On March 4, 2020, Mayor Sotto led the turnover of two 57-seater vessels, the M/B Mutya ng Pasig 1 and M/B Mutya ng Pasig 2 to the ferry service. A 50-seater ferry, M/B Vicente, was also donated to the MMDA by real estate company New San Jose Builders in a turnover ceremony on March 5, 2021.

Ridership
As of October 24, 2022, the MMDA has reported that during the months of January to September, a total of 113,609 passengers have rode the Pasig River Ferry Service in 2022, up from a total of 30,310 passengers in 2021.

Ferry network

The entire ferry network has 13 stations in operation. The first line is the Pasig River Line which stretches from Plaza Mexico in Intramuros, Manila to Pinagbuhatan Station in Pasig. The second line is the Marikina River Line which serves the Guadalupe Station in Makati up to Santa Elena Station in Marikina.

The Marikina River Line was to begin operation with the opening of the Riverbanks Station near the recently opened SM City Marikina in Marikina. The Marikina River Line as of February 23, 2009 is still closed and is still undergoing vehicular planning.

The Pasig River Ferry Service is open every Monday to Saturday from 6:30 am to 5:30 pm.

The fare starts from ₱15 to ₱95, but since 2019, the services are free of charge.

Through its entire operation, the ferry service changed their trip schedules several times. Each boat has a 30-minute, 1-hour, 2-hour and 3-hour trip intervals depending on the time of the day. Rush hours tend to have shorter boat intervals while off-peak hours tend to have longer boat intervals. This was done to maximize the efficiency of each boats and to reduce over-consumption of fuel.

Bicycles are allowed to be brought onto the ferry boats, including bikes as large as mountain bikes.

Stations

As of July 10, 2022, there are 13 operational ferry stations. Prior to the MMDA takeover, the Eastwood station in Quezon City and Riverbanks station in Marikina were operational. Though plans were laid out to eventually restore services there, these are currently not operational. The MMDA plans to repair and reopen the Riverbanks station once the Marikina River is confirmed to be navigable for ferry services, and has plans to construct an additional station in the vicinity of the Department of Budget and Management central office and Isla de Convalecencia in San Miguel, Manila, and Intramuros, Manila.

In September 2018, the Plaza Mexico station was demolished to give way to the construction of the Binondo-Intramuros Bridge. In its place, the MMDA is planning to reconstruct the station along Maestranza Street.

Active fleet
The Pasig River Ferry System has a fleet composed of more than 11 boats of varying passenger capacity.

Some boats used and operated by the MMDA are notably named after past MMDA chairpersons.

Former fleet
The system formerly used twin-hulled, double-engine catamaran-type ships with a maximum seating capacity of 150 people. These ships were air-conditioned, had restrooms, equipped with radio, sound systems, a public address system, and utilized fixed plastic chairs. These boats were constructed by the Nautical Transport Services, Inc, and were approved by the Maritime Industry Authority on December 10, 2006.

The 2014 iteration of the Pasig River Ferry System operated 14 Manta boats manufactured by the Cebu-based Stordal Marine Corporation. Each boat can carry 15 passengers each.

See also
 Pasig River Expressway
 Water taxi
 Maritime Industry Authority
 Pasig River Rehabilitation Commission
 Department of Transportation (Philippines)
 Metropolitan Manila Development Authority
 Pasig river rehabilitation

Notes

References

Department of Transportation (Philippines)
Transportation in Metro Manila
Ferry Service
Water taxis